Dugas is a Canadian community in Gloucester County, New Brunswick. Marcel Dugas was the first postmaster here and the community was likely named after him. A post office was here from 1907 to 1953.

History

Notable people

See also
List of communities in New Brunswick

References

Communities in Gloucester County, New Brunswick
Designated places in New Brunswick
Local service districts of Gloucester County, New Brunswick